Kaohsiung Municipal Jhongjheng Senior High School (Chinese: 高雄市立中正高級中學), also known as Jhongjheng Senior High School (Chinese: 中正高中) or CCHS或JJHS, is a junior and senior high school located at No. 8, Jhongjheng 1st Road, Lingya District, Kaohsiung City.

History 
On July 1, 1989, Kaohsiung Municipal Jhongjheng Senior High School was established, the campus is located at north of Jhongjheng 1st Road and east of National Freeway No.1, the address is No.8, Jhongjheng 1st Road, Lingya District, Kaohsiung City. Mr. Tian-yong Lin was assigned as the first principal on July 15, and the first enrollment of junior high school students started on September in the same year.

On May 11, 1996, the school renamed as Kaohsiung Municipal Jhongjheng Senior High School, it became a complete high school. The first enrollment of senior high school students started on July 1 in the same year, with 6 normal classes and 1 physical education class.

Principals 

 Tian-yong Lin (July 1, 1989 ~ July 31, 1997)
 Wen-zong Hsu (Aug 1, 1997 ~ July 31, 2005)
 Shuen-an Tu (Aug 1, 2005 ~ July 31, 2013)
 Ruei-sian Gao (Aug 1, 2013 ~ July 31, 2019)
Bing-shan Lu (Aug 1, 2019 ~ present)

See also
National Fengshan Senior High School

References

High schools in Taiwan
Lingya District
Schools in Kaohsiung
Educational institutions established in 1989
1989 establishments in Taiwan